Steele is a city in Kidder County, North Dakota, United States. It is the county seat of Kidder County. The population was 665 at the 2020 census.

Although they bear the same name, the city of Steele is not in Steele County.

History
Steele was platted in 1878 by Wilbur F. Steele, and named for him. The community got its start soon after the railroad was extended to that point. A post office has been in operation at Steele since 1880. The Kidder County Courthouse was built in 1883.

The high temperature was 121 degrees Fahrenheit in Steele, N.D. in July 1936.

Geography
Steele is located at  (46.856066, -99.916606).

Climate
This event, during the 1936 North American heat wave, is even more remarkable in light of the fact that since 1948, the temperature has not exceeded . It was the highest temperature recorded so far north on the North American continent until June 29, 2021, when it was exceeded in Lytton, British Columbia by only 0.3 °F. A prolonged period of extreme drought across the entire Great Plains contributed to the extreme heat. Record high temperatures for 15 states fell that summer. In the United States, higher temperatures have been recorded in only four states: California, Arizona, Nevada, and New Mexico. (Kansas set its own 121 °F record on July 24.)

According to the averages, Steele has a humid continental climate (Dfb) with warm to hot summers and very cold winters, typical of the Great Plains. Though summer's highs average  there are still 17–18 days on average of above . January nights average , and subzero temperatures happen on multiple occasions every winter.

Demographics

2010 census
As of the census of 2010, there were 715 people, 316 households, and 194 families residing in the city. The racial makeup of the city was 95.9% White, 0.7% African American, 0.3% Native American, 2.1% Asian, 0.7% from other races, and 0.3% from two or more races. Hispanic or Latino of any race were 1.5% of the population.

There were 316 households, of which 27.5% had children under the age of 18 living with them, 47.8% were married couples living together, 7.9% had a female householder with no husband present, 5.7% had a male householder with no wife present, and 38.6% were non-families. 35.4% of all households were made up of individuals, and 19.3% had someone living alone who was 65 years of age or older. The average household size was 2.26 and the average family size was 2.89.

The median age in the city was 41.9 years. 25.5% of residents were under the age of 18; 6.2% were between the ages of 18 and 24; 21.6% were from 25 to 44; 25.5% were from 45 to 64; and 21.4% were 65 years of age or older. The gender makeup of the city was 47.8% male and 52.2% female.

2000 census
As of the census of 2000, there were 761 people, 336 households, and 191 families residing in the city. The population density was 1,338.5 people per square mile (515.5/km). There were 367 housing units at an average density of 645.5 per square mile (248.6/km). The racial makeup of the city was 99.61% White, 0.13% African American and 0.26% Native American.

There were 336 households, out of which 23.8% had children under the age of 18 living with them, 47.6% were married couples living together, 6.8% had a female householder with no husband present, and 42.9% were non-families. 40.5% of all households were made up of individuals, and 28.0% had someone living alone who was 65 years of age or older. The average household size was 2.13 and the average family size was 2.88.

In the city, the population was spread out, with 22.6% under the age of 18, 4.9% from 18 to 24, 22.9% from 25 to 44, 17.9% from 45 to 64, and 31.8% who were 65 years of age or older. The median age was 45 years. For every 100 females, there were 87.0 males. For every 100 females age 18 and over, there were 75.8 males.

The median income for a household in the city was $27,841, and the median income for a family was $37,778. Males had a median income of $35,250 versus $20,673 for females. The per capita income for the city was $16,767. About 8.7% of families and 14.1% of the population were below the poverty line, including 14.1% of those under age 18 and 20.0% of those age 65 or over.

See also
 First Presbyterian Church of Steele

References

External links
City of Steele official website

Cities in Kidder County, North Dakota
Cities in North Dakota
County seats in North Dakota
Populated places established in 1881
1881 establishments in Dakota Territory